The 1985 BCE Canadian Masters was a professional non-ranking snooker tournament that took place between 29 October–2 November 1985 at the CBC Television Studios in Toronto, Canada.

Dennis Taylor won the tournament by defeating Steve Davis 9–5 in the final.

Main draw

References

Canadian Masters (snooker)
Canadian Masters
Canadian Masters
Canadian Masters
Canadian Masters